Youn's Kitchen is a South Korean television reality show that aired on tvN on Fridays nights from March 24, 2017 to March 23, 2018, for a total of twenty episodes.

Cast

Season 1

Season 2

Main dish

Season 1
Youn's main ingredient was bulgogi, which was available in three dishes: Bulgogi Rice, Bulgogi Noodles and Bulgogi Burger. Prior to filming, Youn met with Lee Won-il and Hong Seok-cheon to ask for advice, and received expertise on how to operate Youn's Kitchen, including menu development and restaurant management. From the 4th episode, new items were added to the menu, such as fried dumplings and buns, egg rolls, dumplings, and ramyeon. From the 5th episode, chicken was added.

Season 2
The main dish of Youn's Restaurant was bibimbap, and there were initially three varieties: bulgogi bibimbap, spicy pork bibimbap, and vegetable bibimbap. For this season, Youn again met chef Lee Won-il and Hong Seok-cheon for advice and received further know-how on restaurant operations. Kimchi was also on the initial menu. From the 2nd episode, a traditional noodle dish called japchae was added. From the 3rd episode, the spicy pork bibimbap was removed and Korean fried chicken was added. From the 4th episode, ribs were added. From the 6th episode, kimchi fried rice was added.

Viewership and ratings

Viewership

Ratings
In the tables below,  marks the lowest ratings in each season and  marks the highest ratings.
This show airs on a cable channel/pay TV which normally has a relatively smaller audience compared to free-to-air TV/public broadcasters (KBS, SBS, MBC & EBS).

Season 1

Season 2

Awards and nominations

References

External links
  
  

2017 South Korean television series debuts
TVN (South Korean TV channel) original programming
South Korean reality television series
South Korean cooking television series
Television series set in restaurants
Television shows set in Indonesia
Television shows set in the Canary Islands
Television shows set on islands
Korean-language television shows
Korean cuisine